Thomas Frank   was an English priest.

Fox was born in Cranfield and educated at Merton College, Oxford. He held the living at Cranfield and was Archdeacon of Bedford and a Canon of Lincoln Cathedral from 1704 until his death on 2 March 1731.

Notes

1731 deaths
Lincoln Cathedral
Alumni of Merton College, Oxford
Archdeacons of Bedford
18th-century English Anglican priests